St. Joseph's Anglo-Chinese School (often abbreviated as SJACS) is an aided boys' secondary school in Kwun Tong District, Hong Kong. Founded in 1958 by Rev. Bro. Paul Sun, it was the first secondary school located in Kwun Tong. It is a Catholic school affiliated with the Diocese of Hong Kong. The patron saint of the school is Saint Joseph, and the school anniversary day is 19 March, the feast of St. Joseph.

History 
The school was founded by Rev. Bro. Paul Sun in 1958 in a villa on Kwun Tong Road, now the premise of St. Joseph's Anglo-Chinese Primary School (SJACPS). At first, the primary and secondary sections operated together. In 1967, the secondary section moved to 61 Kwun Tong Road, which is now the ex-premise. In 2008, the school celebrated its Golden Jubilee, and in January 2011 moved to Jordan Valley New Campus.

In the academic year of 2017-18, the school celebrated its 60th Anniversary (Diamond Jubilee), whose celebrations included several open days and carnivals, facility upgrades, the Diamond Jubilee Walkathon, Brother Paul Sun's Memorial Rites, and several others, all with the theme of "Homecoming" - featuring alumni as the star of the theme. Due to the packed frequency of events, the cancellation of the second term joint-test was required.

School Song

Campus 
 Jordan Valley New Campus 

The campus is located at 46 New Clear Water Bay Road, Jordan Valley, Kowloon, near Ngau Chi Wan, Choi Wan Estate, Ping Shek Estate, Shun Lee Estate.

 Kwun Tong Road Ex-premise 
The campus was located at 61 Kwun Tong Road, Ngau Chi Wan, Kowloon, near Kai Yip Estate, Kowloon Bay, Jordan Valley, Ping Shek Estate, Choi Hung Estate.

Extra-Curricular Activities 
A wide variety of extra-curricular activities are created for students to participate in. Separated as ECA A (Sports), ECA B (Academic) and ECA C (Variable), each ECA session spans two lessons on each Friday. Students are to select 1 ECA A program, and 1 ECA B program (first Friday would be ECA A, the next would be ECA B, as it goes on.); or 1 ECA C program to participate in (spanning all ECA sessions). 
For a complete list, please visit the school website.

See also
 Education in Hong Kong
 List of secondary schools in Hong Kong

References 

 Secondary School Profiles
 SJACS History from Official Website
 "Item for Public Works Subcommittee of Finance Committee of the Legislative Council【PWSC(2008-09)16】", 262ES – A secondary school at development near Choi Wan Road and Jordan Valley, Kwun Tong, 21 May 2008.

External links

 SJACS Official Website
 The Josephian Association
 Rev. Bro. Paul Sun Education Foundation
 SJACPS Official Website

Catholic secondary schools in Hong Kong
Educational institutions established in 1958
Boys' schools in Hong Kong
Secondary schools in Hong Kong
Ngau Chi Wan
Kwun Tong
1958 establishments in Hong Kong